Bubarida is an order of demosponges in the subclass Heteroscleromorpha.

References

External links 
 

Heteroscleromorpha
Sponge orders